is a Japanese professional footballer who plays as an attacking midfielder or a winger for J.League club Júbilo Iwata.

Club statistics
Last update: 2 December 2018.

 1 includes J. League Championship, Japanese Super Cup and Suruga Bank Championship appearances.

Reserves performance
Last Update:25 February 2019

Honors
J. League Division 1 - 2014
J. League Division 2 - 2013
Emperor's Cup - 2014, 2015
J. League Cup - 2014
Japanese Super Cup - 2015

References

External links
Profile at FC Tokyo

1992 births
Living people
Association football people from Osaka Prefecture
Sportspeople from Osaka
Japanese footballers
J1 League players
J2 League players
J3 League players
Gamba Osaka players
Gamba Osaka U-23 players
Vissel Kobe players
FC Tokyo players
Júbilo Iwata players
Association football midfielders